Visionary Related Entertainment, LLC is Hawaii's largest radio group, with four out of five of their Honolulu stations being one of the top rated stations in the state.

Stations
KAOI in Kihei, Hawaii
KAOI-FM in Wailuku, Hawaii
KDLX in Makawao, Hawaii
KEWE in Kihei, Hawaii
KHEI in Kihei, Hawaii
KNUQ in Paaulio, Hawaii

The following stations are now owned by Ohana Broadcast Company:

KDDB 102.7 Da Bomb
KPOI 105.9 The Ride
KQMQ 93.1 The Zone
KQNG Kong 93.5
KSHK 103.1 Shaka
KSRF 95.9 Da Pa'ina
KUAI AM 570
KUMU 94.7 Hawaii's KUMU

References

Companies based in Honolulu
Entertainment companies of the United States